Phil Kelly (born 1946) is an English journalist.

Born in Wigan and educated at St Mary's College Crosby and Leeds University, Kelly worked on Time Out and the Leveller in the 1970s and joined Tribune in the mid-1980s, working as a reporter and then news editor before becoming editor (1987–1991).

Kelly subsequently worked as an aide to the Labour MP, Michael Meacher. He was a Labour Islington councillor in 1984-86 and 1990–98, latterly as the council's deputy leader. He was re-elected to the Council in 2006.

He then became a partner at public affairs consultants Butler Kelly Ltd.

References

1946 births
Living people
English male non-fiction writers
English male journalists
English public relations people
Labour Party (UK) councillors
Councillors in the London Borough of Islington
Mayors of places in Greater London
People educated at St Mary's College, Crosby
People from Wigan